The Lower Saxon Circle was an Imperial Circle of the Holy Roman Empire. It covered much of the territory of the medieval Duchy of Saxony (except for Westphalia), and was originally called the Saxon Circle before later being better differentiated from the Upper Saxon Circle by the more specific name.

An unusual aspect of this circle was that, at various times, the kings of Denmark (in Holstein), Great Britain (in Hanover) and Sweden (in Bremen) were all Princes of a number of Imperial States.

Origin
The first plans for a Lower Saxon Circle originate from Albert II of Germany in 1438. An Imperial Saxon Circle was formally created in 1500, but in 1512 it was divided into an Upper Saxon and Lower Saxon Circle. The division was only codified in 1522, and it took a while before the separation was completely implemented by the Imperial Chamber Court. Furthermore, the first mention of an Upper Saxon Circle, a Lower Saxon Circle or the Netherlands occurred much later on. The term Lower Saxony (Niedersachsen) was first used only in 1548.

Territory
The Lower Saxon Circle included the easternmost part of current Lower Saxony, the northernmost part of Saxony-Anhalt (excluding the Altmark), Mecklenburg, Holstein (excluding Dithmarschen), Hamburg, Bremen, in addition to small areas in Brandenburg and Thuringia. For the most part it was a continuous territory with the exception of small enclaves like Halle and Jüterbog. Nordhausen and Mühlhausen were also areas outside the continuous portion of the imperial circle. Within the circle was the Prince-Bishopric of Verden, which was in personal union with the Archbishopric of Bremen since 1502. The Counties of Schaumburg and Spiegelberg were also part of the personal union, but they were not a part of the Lower Saxon Circle.

By the downfall of the Holy Roman Empire, the circle had 2,120,00 inhabitants and an area of 1,240 square miles. With respect to religion, almost all the citizens were Protestant. The exception was the partially Catholic Bishopric of Hildesheim.

Structure
A large part of the circle was made up of territories ruled by the House of Welf. With the Protestant Reformation the newly converted Archbishopric of Magdeburg was ruled from 1513 by administrators from the Brandenburg line of the House of Hohenzollern. Also, in 1648 the Bishopric of Halberstadt was given to the Margraviate of Brandenburg. The Archbishopric of Bremen, after the Reformation, was ruled by Danes and Swedes, and after 1715 by the House of Welf. Through the Duchy of Oldenburg, the king of Denmark became a prince of the imperial circle.

Also as a result of their possessions in the imperial circles, the kings of Prussia, Sweden, and Great Britain, who governed the Electorate of Brunswick-Lüneburg, became princes of the empire. Out of the entire empire, the Lower Saxon Circle was ruled the most by foreign kings. Regardless of this, the House of Welf's strong position with the Lower Saxon Circle prevented the dukes of Mecklenburg and the kings of Denmark from completely dominating.

Composition 
The circle was made up of the following states:

Notes

Sources 
 The list of states making up the Lower Saxon Circle is based on that in the German Wikipedia article Niedersächsischer Reichskreis.

External links 
 Imperial Circles in the 16th Century – Historical Maps of Germany

 
Circles of the Holy Roman Empire
History of Lower Saxony
1500s establishments in the Holy Roman Empire
1500 establishments in Europe